The 2006 Motor City Bowl, part of the 2006–07 NCAA football bowl games season, occurred on December 26, 2006, at Ford Field in Detroit, Michigan. The Central Michigan Chippewas beat the Middle Tennessee Blue Raiders 31–14.

References

Motor City Bowl
Little Caesars Pizza Bowl
Central Michigan Chippewas football bowl games
Middle Tennessee Blue Raiders football bowl games
December 2006 sports events in the United States
Motor City Bowl
2006 in Detroit